Gnumeric is a spreadsheet program that is part of the GNOME Free Software Desktop Project. Gnumeric version 1.0 was released on 31 December 2001. Gnumeric is distributed as free software under the GNU General Public License; it is intended to replace proprietary spreadsheet programs like Microsoft Excel. Gnumeric was created and developed by Miguel de Icaza, but he has since moved on to other projects. The maintainer  was Jody Goldberg.

Features
Gnumeric has the ability to import and export data in several file formats, including CSV, Microsoft Excel (write support for the more recent .xlsx format is incomplete), Microsoft Works spreadsheets (.wks), HTML, LaTeX, Lotus 1-2-3, OpenDocument and Quattro Pro; its native format is the Gnumeric file format (.gnm or .gnumeric), an XML file compressed with gzip. It includes all of the spreadsheet functions of the North American edition of Microsoft Excel and many functions unique to Gnumeric. Pivot tables and Visual Basic for Applications macros are not yet supported.

Gnumeric's accuracy has helped it to establish a niche for statistical analysis and other scientific tasks. For improving the accuracy of Gnumeric, the developers are cooperating with the R Project.

Gnumeric has an interface for the creation and editing of graphs different from other spreadsheet software. For editing a graph, Gnumeric displays a window where all the elements of the graph are listed. Other spreadsheet programs typically require the user to select the individual elements of the graph in the graph itself in order to edit them.

Gnumeric is available in Version 1.12.50.

Gnumeric under Microsoft Windows
Gnumeric releases were ported to Microsoft Windows until August 2014 (the latest versions were 1.10.16 and 1.12.17).

Use of current version of Gnumeric on Windows is possible with MSYS2 with experienced know-how of a Linux/Unix user. After GTK+ 2.24.10 and 3.6.4, development of Windows version was closed by GNOME. Creation of Windows version was complicated by bugs in old Windows versions of GTK+.

Installation of MSYS2 on Windows is a good way to use current GTK software. GTK+ 2.24.10 and 3.6.4 are available on-line. Versions of GTK for 64-bit Windows are prepared by Tom Schoonjans – current examples are 2.24.32 and 3.24.23. This could be also a new start for a new native 64-bit Windows version of Gnumeric.

See also

 EditGrid – was an on-line spreadsheet which used Gnumeric as its back-end
 List of spreadsheet software
 Comparison of spreadsheet software

References

External links

 
 Gnumeric XML File Format
 Open Mag interviews Jody Goldberg on Gnumeric. Nancy Cohen, 17 February 2004; archived 2012
 Linux Productivity Magazine Volume 2 Issue 6, June 2003: full issue on Introduction to Gnumeric

2001 software
Business software for Linux
Cross-platform software
Free software programmed in C
Free spreadsheet software
Office software that uses GTK
Plotting software